Zolotavtsevo is a rural locality (a village) in Yudinskoye Rural Settlement, Velikoustyugsky District, Vologda Oblast, Russia. The population was 354 as of 2002. There are 20 streets.

Geography 
Zolotavtsevo is located 6 km northwest of Veliky Ustyug (the district's administrative centre) by road. Krasnoye Pole is the nearest rural locality.

References 

Rural localities in Velikoustyugsky District